Tales from the Crypt is a 1972 British horror film directed by Freddie Francis. It is an anthology film consisting of five separate segments, based on stories from EC Comics. It was produced by Amicus Productions and filmed at Shepperton Studios.

In the film, five strangers (Joan Collins, Ian Hendry, Robin Phillips, Richard Greene and Nigel Patrick) in a crypt encounter the mysterious Crypt Keeper (Ralph Richardson), who makes each person in turn foresee the possible manner of their death. It is one of several Amicus horror anthologies produced during the 1970s.

Plot

Intro
Five strangers go with a tourist group to view old catacombs. Separated from the main group, the strangers find themselves in a room with the mysterious Crypt Keeper (Ralph Richardson), who details how each of them may die.

"...And All Through the House"
 Taken from The Vault of Horror #35 (February–March 1954).

Joanne Clayton (Joan Collins) kills her husband Richard (Martin Boddey) on Christmas Eve. She prepares to hide his body, but hears a radio announcement of a homicidal maniac (Oliver MacGreevy) on the loose. She sees the killer (who is dressed in a Santa Claus costume) outside her house, but cannot call the police without exposing her own crime.

After cleaning up, Joanne finally attempts to call the police (with the intention to make them believe the maniac killed her husband). However, her young daughter Carol (Chloe Franks) — believing the maniac to be Santa — unlocks the door and lets him into the house, whereupon he starts to strangle Joanne.

"Reflection of Death"
 Taken from Tales from the Crypt #23 (April–May 1951).

Carl Maitland (Ian Hendry) abandons his family to be with his secretary, Susan Blake (Angela Grant). After they drive off together, they are involved in a car accident. He wakes up, having been thrown clear of the wrecked and burned car, and attempts to hitchhike home, but everyone he meets reacts with horror upon seeing him.

Arriving at his house, he sees his wife (Susan Denny) with another man. He knocks on the door, but she screams and slams the door. He then goes to see Susan, only to find that she is blind from the accident. She says that Carl died two years ago in the crash. Glancing at a reflective tabletop, he sees he has the face of a rotting corpse and screams in horror. Carl then wakes up and finds out that it was a dream, but the moment he does, the crash occurs as previously seen.

"Poetic Justice"
 Taken from The Haunt of Fear #12 (March–April 1952).

James Elliot (Robin Phillips) lives with his father Edward (David Markham) across from the home of elderly dustman Arthur Edward Grimsdyke (Peter Cushing), who owns a number of dogs and entertains children in his house. While both the Elliots are snobs who resent Grimsdyke as a blight on their neighbourhood, James strongly detests the old man enough to conduct a smear campaign against him: first having his beloved dogs taken by animal control (although one of them returns to him), then persuading a member of the council to have him removed from his job, and later exploiting parents' paranoid fears about child molestation. Unbeknownst to James, Grimsdyke dabbles in the occult and holds a seance by himself to confer with his late wife.

On Valentine's Day, James sends Grimsdyke a number of poison-pen Valentines, supposedly from the neighbours, driving the old man to suicide. Exactly one year later, Grimsdyke rises from the grave and takes revenge on James. The following morning, Edward finds his son dead with a note that reads, "HAPPY VALENTINE'S DAY..YOU WERE MEAN AND CRUEL..RIGHT FROM THE START..NOW YOU REALLY HAVE NO.." with the final word represented by James' still-beating heart inside the folded end of the paper on which the note is written.

"Wish You Were Here"
 Taken from The Haunt of Fear #22 (November–December 1953). A variation on W. W. Jacobs's short story "The Monkey's Paw".

Ineffective, ruthless businessman Ralph Jason (Richard Greene) is close to financial ruin. His wife Enid (Barbara Murray) notices, for the first time, the inscription on a Chinese figurine in the couple's collection, which grants three wishes to the owner. Enid decides to wish for a fortune and, surprisingly, the wish comes true, but Ralph is killed, seemingly in a car crash, on the way to his lawyer's office to collect the money. The lawyer, Charles Gregory (Roy Dotrice), then advises Enid she will inherit a fortune from her deceased husband's life insurance plan; however, when he learns of the manner of the wish granted that she made, he warns her not to wish Ralph back since he remembered the consequences of a similar story in which a mother wished her dead son back, only to be horrified by his gruesome appearance and forced to use the last wish to send him back to the grave. Against Gregory's explicit advice, Enid uses her second wish to bring him back to the way he was just before the accident, but he is returned still dead, as his death was due to a heart attack immediately before the crash and caused by fright upon seeing the figure of "death" following him on a motorcycle.

Once more, Gregory warns Enid not to make a final wish and just let Ralph rest in peace. As Gregory goes outside to get some fresh air, she uses her final wish to bring Ralph back to life and to live forever. When he comes back inside, he discovers too late that Enid again went against his warning. Gregory points out to her that Ralph was embalmed and he is suffering from the effects of the embalming liquid. Enid tries to kill Ralph to end his pain but, because she wished for him to live forever, he cannot be killed. Because of it, she has now trapped him in eternal agony and thus making her regret those last two wishes.

"Blind Alleys"
 Taken from Tales from the Crypt #46 (February–March 1955).

Major William Rogers (Nigel Patrick) becomes the new director of a home for the blind, and exploits his position to live in luxury with his German Shepherd Shane, while his drastic financial cuts on food and heating reduces the residents' quality of life. Rogers gets his comeuppance after he ignores the pleas of resident George Carter (Patrick Magee) to both make the living conditions more bearable and later to get medical treatment for fellow resident Greenwood, who then dies from hypothermia. Carter leads a revolt to subdue the staff before locking Rogers and Shane in separate rooms in the basement, and they then construct a small maze of narrow corridors between the two rooms. After two days left to starve, Rogers is released and forced to find his way through the maze for his freedom, getting past one corridor lined with razor blades once Carter turns the lights on; but Rogers finds his last obstacle to be a ravenous Shane. He flees back towards the razors, only for Carter to turn the lights off. Rogers is heard screaming as the hungry dog catches up with him.

Finale
After completing the final tale, the Crypt Keeper reveals that he was not warning them of what would happen, but telling them what has already happened: they have all "died without repentance". There is one clue to this twist in that Joan Collins' character is wearing the brooch her husband had given her for Christmas just before she killed him. The door to Hell opens and Joanne, Carl, James, Ralph, and Major Rogers all enter (Ralph enters first and is seen falling down into a fiery abyss). "And now, who's next?" asks the Crypt Keeper, turning to face the camera as he says "Perhaps...YOU?" The scene pulls away as the entrance to the Crypt Keeper's lair is in flames.

Cast
Wraparounds:
 Ralph Richardson – The Crypt Keeper
 Geoffrey Bayldon – Tour Guide

"...And All Through the House":
 Joan Collins – Joanne Clayton
 Martin Boddey – Richard Clayton
 Chloe Franks – Carol Clayton
 Oliver MacGreevy – Santa Suit Maniac
 Robert Rietti – Radio Announcer (voice, uncredited)

"Reflection of Death":
 Ian Hendry – Carl Maitland
 Susan Denny – Mrs. Maitland
 Angela Grant – Susan Blake
 Peter Fraser – Motorist
 Frank Forsyth – Tramp

"Poetic Justice":
 Robin Phillips – James Elliot
 David Markham – Edward Elliot
 Peter Cushing – Arthur Edward Grimsdyke
 Robert Hutton – Mr. Baker
 Manning Wilson – Vicar
 Clifford Earl – Police Sergeant
 Edward Evans – Constable Ramsey
 Irene Gawne – Mrs. Phelps
 Stafford Medhurst – Mrs. Phelps' son

"Wish You Were Here":
 Richard Greene – Ralph Jason
 Barbara Murray – Enid Jason
 Roy Dotrice – Charles Gregory
 Jane Sofiano – Secretary
 Peter Thomas – Pallbearer
 Hedger Wallace – Detective

"Blind Alleys":
 Nigel Patrick – Major William Rogers
 Patrick Magee – George Carter
 George Herbert – Greenwood
 Harry Locke – Harry the Cook
 Tony Wall – Attendant
 John Barrard – Blind Man (uncredited)

Production 
Milton Subotsky of Amicus Productions had long been a fan of EC Comics' Tales from the Crypt and eventually persuaded his partner Max Rosenberg to buy the rights. The copyright owner, William Gaines, insisted on script approval. The budget of £170,000 was higher than usual for an Amicus production, and was partly funded by American International Pictures. Peter Cushing was originally offered the part played by Richard Greene, but wanted to try something different and played the elderly Grimsdyke instead.

Filming dates
Filming started on 13 September 1971 and finished in 1972.

Release

Critical reception
, Rotten Tomatoes, a review aggregator, reported that 90% of 21 surveyed critics gave the film a positive review, with an average score of 7.07/10.

Allmoviesaid, "It has a certain magnetism about it that is hard to resist and which accounts for its enduring popularity. There's something about Crypt that makes even jaded viewers feel like they're kids sitting in their rooms late at night with the lights out, telling eerie tales with the aid of a flashlight."

Vincent Canby of The New York Times wrote that the film lacks style and is too heavy-handed in its morality.

Eric Henderson of Slant Magazine rated it 2.5/5 stars and wrote that "the undercurrent of sternness is tempered by a truly bottomless roster of campy excess".

Chris Alexander of Fangoria wrote, "[F]rom its first frames to its invasive final shot, this classic British creeper offers an unrelenting study in the art of the macabre."

Anthony Arrigo of Dread Central wrote, "The greatest strength in Tales comes not from the acting or directing – both of which are perfectly sound – but in the rich stories culled from the comics."

Roger Ebert of the Chicago Sun-Time gave the film three out of four stars, saying “It's put together something like the comic books, with the old Crypt Keeper acting as host and narrator. In the movie version, he is played with suitable ham by Ralph Richardson”.

Home media
The film was released on VHS in North America by Prism Entertainment Corp in 1985, then by Starmaker Home Video in 1989, and finally by 20th Century Fox Home Entertainment under their Selections label in 1998. 

In the UK it was released on VHS in 1988 by CBS Fox Video having been rated 18 without cuts by the BBFC. 

Tales from the Crypt was released on DVD in the United Kingdom on 28 June 2010. It received its first Blu-ray release from Shock Records distribution in Australia on 2 November 2011. 

The film, paired with another Amicus anthology, The Vault of Horror, was released on a double-feature DVD on 11 September 2007. Shout! Factory released the same double feature on Blu-ray on 2 December 2014.

Points of interest 
 Only two of the stories are from EC's Tales from the Crypt comic book. The reason for this, according to Creepy founding editor Russ Jones, is that producer Milton Subotsky did not own a run of the original EC comic book but instead adapted the movie from the two paperback reprints given to him by Jones. The story "Wish You Were Here" was reprinted in the paperback collection The Vault of Horror (Ballantine, 1965). The other four stories in the movie were among the eight stories reprinted in Tales from the Crypt (Ballantine, 1964).
 Richardson's hooded Crypt Keeper, more sombre than the EC original (as illustrated by Al Feldstein and Jack Davis), has a monk-like appearance and resembles EC's GhouLunatics. In the EC horror comics, the other horror hosts (the Old Witch and the Vault Keeper) wore hoods, while the Crypt Keeper did not.
 The earlier Amicus anthology film Torture Garden features a similar ending breaking the fourth wall.
 The screenplay was adapted into a tie-in novel by Jack Oleck, Tales from the Crypt (Bantam, 1972). Oleck, who wrote the novel Messalina (1950), also scripted for EC's Picto-Fiction titles, Crime Illustrated, Shock Illustrated and Terror Illustrated. A tie-in novel was also written by Oleck for the later Amicus anthology film The Vault Of Horror, released in 1973.

Connections to the TV series 

"...And All Through the House", "Blind Alleys" and "Wish You Were Here" were all somewhat remade into episodes for the Tales From the Crypt television show. "Blind Alleys" and "Wish You Were Here" were both changed.

 "...And All Through the House" had the woman killing her husband so that she can take her daughter and live with her boyfriend. The episode ended with her daughter letting the axe-wielding maniac into the house as he quotes "Naughty or Nice" with the episode ending with the woman screaming. The Crypt Keeper stated that the daughter was not harmed because the escaped maniac “preferred older women... in pieces”.
 "Blind Alleys" was now "Revenge is the Nuts" and was about a beautiful blind girl (portrayed by Teri Polo) who comes to live at a house for the blind where the sadistic director (played by The Dead Zones Anthony Zerbe) tries to sexually assault her. In the end, she and the other residents take their revenge on the director in the same fashion as in the original story.
 "Wish You Were Here" is similar to the TV series' 7th-season episode "Last Respects" in that both borrow plot elements from W. W. Jacobs's classic short story "The Monkey's Paw" and both are directed by the original film's director Freddie Francis. Like many of the show's episodes, "Last Respects" uses the title of an existing story from the comics (Tales From The Crypt #23), but does not use the story itself. The statue from the film is reverted to the original monkey's paw in the TV episode, and the story now deals with three sisters who come into possession of it. One wishes for 1 million pounds, and she and the second sister are in a car crash where she dies, and her life insurance policy is for 1 million pounds. When the third sister wishes that the dead sister was the way she was just before the crash, she learns that she was actually killed by the second sister. In a form of revenge, the third sister gives her last wish to her sister, but she did not say which sister she wanted to give it to, thus beating the monkey's paw at its own game. The third wish is transferred to the dead sister, who comes back from the dead to kill the second sister.

References

External links 
 
 
 
 

1972 films
1972 horror films
1970s British films
1970s English-language films
Amicus Productions films
British films about revenge
British horror anthology films
British serial killer films
British supernatural horror films
British zombie films
Films about blind people
Films about death
Films about wish fulfillment
Films based on American comics
Films directed by Freddie Francis
Films scored by Douglas Gamley
Films set in England
Films shot at Shepperton Studios
Gothic horror films
Hell in popular culture
Live-action films based on comics
Mariticide in fiction
Metromedia Producers Corporation films
Santa Claus in film
Tales from the Crypt films
Valentine's Day in films